John Lee (1837 - 1881) was a state legislator who served in the South Carolina State Senate during the Reconstruction era from 1872 until 1874.

Biography  
Lee was born in Columbia, South Carolina in 1837 and was self educated.

He represented Chester County, South Carolina in the South Carolina State Senate from 1872 until 1874, as a Republican.

Lee also held several other positions during the Reconstruction era including in 1870 a magistrate and trial justice, in 1871 county auditor, postmaster, census marshal, commissioner of elections in 1876.

He served as a captain in the state militia from 1870 until 1873 and then as colonel of the Fourteenth Regiment of the National Guard from 1873 until 1876.

Lee also was a founder of two companies the Champion Hook and Ladder Company in 1871 and the Newberry and Chester Railroad Company.

In 1876 Lee was arrested, but not charged, for the misappropriation of militia money.

He died in Chester, South Carolina sometime shortly before March 10, 1881 when his "recent" death was reported.

See also
 African-American officeholders during and following the Reconstruction era

References

1837 births
1881 deaths
People from Columbia, South Carolina
People from Chester, South Carolina
South Carolina state senators